Hugh Morris  (born 5 October 1963) is a Welsh former cricketer, who played in three Tests for England in 1991. He played county cricket for Glamorgan, captaining the county, and after several senior roles for the England and Wales Cricket Board he returned to Glamorgan as chief executive and director of cricket in August 2013.

The cricket correspondent, Colin Bateman, described Morris as "a talented, easy-going cricketer".

Life and career
Morris was born in Cardiff, Wales.  While at Blundell's School, he set several public school batting records. He also played rugby union for Aberavon.

A left-handed opening batsman, Morris was Glamorgan's youngest captain at the age of 22 when appointed in 1986, and stood down from the role three years later to concentrate on his batting.  He captained an England A tour of Pakistan and Sri Lanka in 1990-1 (the Pakistan leg being curtailed due to the Gulf war). Just before this, he was briefly called in as a "reinforcement" to the England cricket tour of Australia after captain Graham Gooch was injured, and although he only played in two minor matches (in which he scored 33 and 50), Wisden suggesed that "Morris ... but for Gooch's faith in Larkins must have been among the original sixteen". He did however play three Tests in 1991, two against the then-formidable West Indies, and one against Sri Lanka. He found the West Indies' pace attack difficult to handle, and in his three Tests scored 115 runs at an average of 19.16, although he did share England's best partnership of the series (112) with Gooch in his second Test, helping England to a rare and series-levelling victory against the West Indies. That winter he again captained England A on tour of the West Indies. He was reinstated as Glamorgan captain in 1993, and remained on the fringe of further Test selection for a number of years, without ever being selected again.

He captained Glamorgan to victory in the Sunday League that year, a first major trophy since 1969. In 1997 he was part of the Glamorgan side that won the County Championship, scoring 1207 runs at an average of 54.86. 
Morris equalled Alan Jones' club record for first-class centuries in the deciding fixture against Somerset that year.

He worked for several years for the England and Wales Cricket Board, where he was technical coaching director, acting chief executive and deputy chief executive before being appointed to chief executive. In August 2013 he returned to his native Glamorgan as chief executive and director of cricket.

Morris was appointed Member of the Order of the British Empire (MBE) in the 2022 Birthday Honours for services to cricket and charity.

References

External links
 https://web.archive.org/web/20071119165706/http://www.ecb.co.uk/england/morris-appointed-managing-director,15229,EN.html
 http://cricketarchive.com/Archive/Players/1/1993/1993.html

1963 births
Living people
England Test cricketers
Glamorgan cricketers
Glamorgan cricket captains
Cricketers from Sutton-in-Ashfield
Welsh cricketers
People educated at Blundell's School
Marylebone Cricket Club cricketers
Welsh cricket administrators
Welsh cricket coaches
Test and County Cricket Board XI cricketers
Members of the Order of the British Empire